Below is the list of Seljuk kervansarays and  hans in Turkey. Many kervansarays and hans  were built during the Seljuk rule in Turkey. The list is in chronological order. (13th century) There was no clear distinction between the han (inns) the kervansarays . But usually the hans were in the cities and kervansarays were in the rural areas. Being far from the cities, kervansarays offered services like blacksmithing to caravans in addition to accommodation.

The name of the han or kervansaray is shown in the first column. In everyday speech sometimes the name of the han or kervansaray is merged with the suffix han (i.e. Boz → Bozhan). The people who commissioned the construction are shown in the second column. They were generally sultans (like Alaeddin Keykubad I), mothers of sultans (like Melike Mahperi), atabegs (like Ertokuş), governors (like Karasungur), but occasionally persons with no official status. The approximate date of construction is shown in the third column and the location of the han or kervansaray with reference to the end points of the road is shown in the last column. (Where applicable, the name of the location is also given.)

The list

See also
Seljuk architecture

References

External links
The Seljuk han in Anatolia
Hans in Konya Province 
Susuz Han

 Seljuk
Seljuk hans and kervansarays
World Heritage Tentative List for Turkey